The 2015–16 season is Unione Sportiva Sassuolo Calcio's third consecutive season in Serie A. The team will compete in Serie A and the Coppa Italia.

Players

Squad information

Competitions

Serie A

League table

Results summary

Results by round

Matches

Coppa Italia

Statistics

Appearances and goals

|-
! colspan="14" style="background:#dcdcdc; text-align:center"| Goalkeepers

|-
! colspan="14" style="background:#dcdcdc; text-align:center"| Defenders

|-
! colspan="14" style="background:#dcdcdc; text-align:center"| Midfielders

|-
! colspan="14" style="background:#dcdcdc; text-align:center"| Forwards

|-
! colspan="14" style="background:#dcdcdc; text-align:center"| Players transferred out during the season

Goalscorers

Last updated: 14 May 2016

Clean sheets

Last updated: 8 May 2016

References

U.S. Sassuolo Calcio seasons
Sassuolo